Ivy Collegiate Academy is a coeducational college preparatory day and boarding school enrolling students in grades 7-12. Ivy Collegiate Academy is located in Tanzi District, Taichung, Taiwan, and is accredited by the Western Association of Schools and Colleges.

History
Ivy Collegiate Academy was established in 2005 as an American style boarding school serving the needs of local and expatriate families with children.  The founding headmaster (2004-2005) was Dr. Michael Manafo, a Harvard-trained educational administrator.  Dr. Manafo is credited with naming the school "Ivy Collegiate Academy."

References

2005 establishments in Taiwan
Educational institutions established in 2005
International schools in Taichung